CorpWatch is a research group based in Berkeley, California, USA.  Its stated mission is to expose corporate malfeasance and to advocate for multinational corporate accountability and transparency.

Recent Projects
 Crocodyl: Pratap Chatterjee, author of Iraq Inc., Program Director and Managing Editor started a project called Crocodyl, with Phil Mattera of the Corporate Research Project, Charlie Cray of the Center for Corporate Policy and Tonya Hennessey of CorpWatch.  The Project Manager of Crocodyl is Ian Elwood, and its Editors are Phil Mattera, Charlie Cray, Tonya Hennessey and Pratap Chatterjee.
 The Story Behind the Informant! As a part of Participant Media's continuing educational action campaign around corporate ethics and the movie The Informant!, CorpWatch and Crocodyl.org have launched a case study of Archer Daniels Midland.

See also
Corporate Watch in the U.K.

References

External links
 Official site

Research organizations in the United States
Anti-corporate activism
Anti-consumerist groups
Global policy organizations
Social responsibility organizations